The 34th TVyNovelas Awards, is an Academy of special awards to the best of soap operas and TV shows. The awards ceremony took place on April 17, 2016 in Acapulco, Guerrero. The ceremony was televised in Mexico by Canal de las estrellas in the United States by Univision. 

Marjorie de Sousa and Gabriel Soto hosted the show for the first time. A que no me dejas won 7 awards, the most for the evening. Other winners Pasión y poder won 5 awards including Best Telenovela of the Year, Antes muerta que Lichita and La sombra del pasado won 3 awards  and La vecina, Muchacha italiana viene a casarse and  Que te perdone Dios won one each.

Summary of awards and nominations

Winners and nominees

Novelas

Others

Performers

Missing
People who did not attend ceremony wing and were nominated in the shortlist in each category:
Laura Bozzo
Alexis Núñez
Javier Labrada
Emilio Larrosa
Rubén Galindo
Santiago Galindo
Juan Carlos Muñoz
Luis Pardo
Manuel Landeta

References 

TVyNovelas Awards
TVyNovelas Awards
TVyNovelas Awards
TVyNovelas Awards ceremonies